Konstantinos Errikos (Greek: Κωνσταντίνος Ερρίκος; born 11 May 1991) is a Greek professional footballer who currently plays as a midfielder for Peramaikos F.C. in the Football League 2.

Career
Konstantinos Errikos has previously played for Ionikos, Proodeftiki F.C. and Vyzas F.C.

References

External links
 
 
 Myplayer.gr Profile
 Onsports.gr Profile

1991 births
Living people
Ionikos F.C. players
Proodeftiki F.C. players
Association football midfielders
Footballers from Athens
Greek footballers